The Earth Cries Out (also known as Exodus) is a 1948 Italian action-drama film directed by Duilio Coletti.

In 2008 it was restored and shown as part of a retrospective "Questi fantasmi: Cinema italiano ritrovato" at the 65th Venice International Film Festival.

Cast 
Marina Berti as Dina 
Andrea Checchi as Ariè
Vivi Gioi as Judith
Carlo Ninchi as Comandante della nave 
Elena Zareschi as Ada
Filippo Scelzo as Professor Tannen 
Vittorio Duse 
Cesare Polacco   
Arnoldo Foà  
Nerio Bernardi  
Wanda Capodaglio

References

External links

1948 films
Italian action drama films
Films directed by Duilio Coletti
Films set in Israel
Films set in Mandatory Palestine
Italian black-and-white films
1940s action drama films
1940s Italian-language films
Films scored by Alessandro Cicognini
1940s Italian films